The Thomas-Morse O-19 was an American observation biplane built by the Thomas-Morse Aircraft Company for the United States Army Air Corps.

Development 
The O-19 was based on the earlier Thomas-Morse O-6 biplane.  It was a conventional two-seat biplane of metal construction with fabric-covered wings and tail surfaces.  The design was evaluated with a number of different engine installations and the type was ordered into production as the O-19B with a Pratt & Whitney R-1340-7 Wasp radial engine.

Variants 
XO-19
Improved version of the XO-6 with a  Pratt & Whitney R-1340-3 engine, one built.
YO-20
Similar to the XO-19 with a  Pratt & Whitney R-1690-1 engine, one built.
XO-21
Similar to the XO-19 with a  Curtiss H-1640-1 engine, one built, later re-engined as the XO-21A.
XO-21A
The XO-21 fitted with a  Wright R-1750-1 engine.
O-19
Service evaluation aircraft with a  Pratt & Whitney R-1340-9, two built.
O-19A
O-19 without the 88 US Gallon main fuel tank, one built.
O-19B
Production version with a  Pratt & Whitney R-1340-7 engine, two machine-guns and modified cockpit, 70 built.
O-19C
O-19B with tailwheel, ring cowl and minor changes, 71 built.
O-19D
One O-19C converted as a VIP staff transport with dual controls.
O-19E
O-19C with extended upper-span wing and a  Pratt & Whitney R-1340-15 engine, 30 built.
O-21
O-19 with  Curtiss H-1640 Chieftain engine, one built, one converted.
YO-23
XO-19 with a  Curtiss V-1570-1 Conqueror engine, one built.
Y1O-33
One O-19B re-engined with a  Curtiss V-1570-11 engine and revised tail surfaces, one converted.
Y1O-41
A sesqui-plane conversion of the Y1O-33 with a  Curtiss V-1570-79 engine, one converted. Later modified by Consolidated Aircraft as their Model 23 and exported to Mexico.
Y1O-42
High-wing monoplane version of the Y1O-41, static test airframe only.

Operators 

Philippine Army Air Corps

 United States Army Air Corps

Specifications (O-19B)

See also

References

Notes

Bibliography
 John Andrade, U.S.Military Aircraft Designations and Serials since 1909, Midland Counties Publications, 1979,  (Page 137 and 138)
 The Illustrated Encyclopedia of Aircraft (Part Work 1982-1985), 1985, Orbis Publishing, Page 3000

1920s United States military reconnaissance aircraft
O-19
Single-engined tractor aircraft
Biplanes
Aircraft first flown in 1929